Hayden Kho Jr. is a Filipino media personality, model, actor, and cosmetic surgeon.

Life and education
Hayden Kho Jr. was born on May 20, 1980, the third of 4 children. His father, Hayden Kho Sr., is a Chinese doctor, while his mother, Irene dela Santa, is a Spanish-Filipina businesswoman.

He attended Grace Christian High School (now Grace Christian College) in Quezon City. Kho went on to study at the University of Santo Tomas, where he earned his bachelor's degree in medical technology in 2001, and then his medical degree in 2005. He completed his internship at the Makati Medical Center where he also served as president of the interns association. He earned his medical license in 2007.

Kho also completed his training in anti-aging medicine through the European Anti-Aging Medicine Society (Paris). In Manila, Kho practiced specific cosmetic dermatology and surgery procedures under the organization of the Belo Medical Group, owned by Dr. Vicki Belo.

Modeling and showbusiness career
At the age of 16, Kho started his career in ramp modeling while pursuing his bachelor's degree. This stint brought him to places like New York City, Singapore, South Korea and Japan.

In 2007, Kho started appearing on Philippine national television as an actor. He was a contender in Celebrity Duets, and appeared in various supporting roles on TV, as a GMA talent.

Infamy and scandal
Kho's promising career was interrupted when it was reported that Kho had tried to commit suicide in December 2008. In 2009, while already well known in the modeling and showbiz industry, he achieved household infamy in his involvement in a sex scandal.

Kho was brought to a senate hearing and was tried publicly on national television. Attention towards the controversy lasted for years and resulted to criminal and civil cases filed against Kho by one of the involved parties, Filipina actress Katrina Halili, his partner in Celebrity Duets. CNN tagged this incident as the most controversial sex scandal in Asia.

The Philippine Board of Medicine revoked Kho's license to practice medicine and cited unethical behavior as the basis for his expulsion from the medical society. In December of the same year, Kho reportedly attempted to commit suicide for the second time.

Rebuilding career
Losing his medical license was devastating for Kho, and he lost the support of many. In 2011, in an effort to rebuild his career, Kho launched his own eponymous brand of fragrances called, "HAYDEN". He was also tapped as the endorser of the Filipino fashion brand Maldita Man  and by the cosmetic giant Ever Bilena, Inc.

He also hosted the defunct Filipino showbiz-oriented talk show Paparazzi, which was aired on TV5. Kho was also director of the skin care distribution brand ZO Skin Health in the Philippines.

Rebuilding his life
In 2013, Kho met Christian apologist Ravi Zacharias in an event hosted by some leaders of the Christ's Commission Fellowship (CCF) in Manila. Kho became an active member of the group, and later became a devout Christian in June of that year. He was mentored by the late Zacharias, and also by the CCF movement founder, Pastor Peter Tan-Chi.

In 2014, Kho went to the Oxford Centre for Christian Apologetics to study Christian apologetics, where he met and was tutored by Christian sociologist and author Os Guinness; scientist, mathematician, and philosopher John Lennox; theologian and author Alister McGrath; and anti-Islam polemicist Jay Smith, among others.

While Kho was studying in Oxford, the Professional Regulation Commission reinstated his medical license. The same year, all cases against Kho were dismissed. Kho and Halili reconciled thereafter.

In respect to his conversion to Christianity, Kho confirmed that he had been practicing faith-based abstinence. It has been reported that Belo and Kho conceived their first child, Scarlet Snow Belo, via in-vitro fertilization (IVF) who was born on March 3, 2015 - when Belo was 59 years old - through surrogacy with a Mexican-American woman.

Kho attributes his new lease on life to his Christian faith. While devoting much of his energy to his family and business ventures, he accepted certain acting roles in movies such as The Bride and His Lover in 2013, and EDSA, the Movie in 2016.

Kho resumed his medical practice in 2016 at the now-defunct Sexy Solutions clinics. He owns and runs a real estate website called ZoneListing, Inc. He is also invested in various software companies that create apps such as Pocket Market and Paylance.

Current activities 
In September 2017, Kho finally married his best friend and long-time partner, Dr. Vicki Belo, in a lavish ceremony in Paris. In 2018, he continued his studies in Christian apologetics. He also leads the product and services development department of the Belo Medical Group.

Currently, Kho sits on the board of a non-profit organization called RightStart Foundation and supports various causes and community support projects. Recently, Kho shared details of his mental health struggles, and his journey through suicide and depression.

Television

Film

References

External links

1980 births
Living people
University of Santo Tomas alumni
Filipino male models
Filipino male film actors
Filipino surgeons
Sex scandals
Participants in Philippine reality television series
Businesspeople from Metro Manila
Filipino dermatologists
21st-century Filipino businesspeople
Filipino Christians
Filipino evangelicals
21st-century Filipino medical doctors
Filipino people of Chinese descent
Filipino people of Spanish descent
Filipino male television actors
GMA Network personalities
TV5 (Philippine TV network) personalities